7th Cavalry may refer to:

Corps 
 7th Guards Cavalry Corps, a unit of the Soviet Red Army during the Second World War

Divisions 
 7th Cavalry Division (German Empire), a unit of the German Army during the First World War
 7th Cavalry Division (Russian Empire), a unit of the Russian Empire

Brigades 
 7th Indian Cavalry Brigade, a unit of the British Indian Army during the First World War
 7th Cavalry Brigade (United Kingdom), a unit of the British Army during the Napoleonic Wars and the First World War
 7th Cavalry Brigade (United States), a unit of the United States Army during the Second World War, now the 1st Armored Division

Regiments 
 7th Cavalry Regiment, a unit of the United States Army
 7th Light Cavalry, a regiment of the British Indian Army during the First and Second World Wars
 7th Illinois Cavalry Regiment, a Union regiment during the American Civil War
 7th Indiana Cavalry Regiment, a Union regiment during the American Civil War
 7th Iowa Volunteer Cavalry Regiment, a Union regiment during the American Civil War
 7th Kansas Volunteer Cavalry Regiment, a Union regiment during the American Civil War
 7th Regiment Kentucky Volunteer Cavalry, a Union regiment during the American Civil War
 7th Michigan Volunteer Cavalry Regiment, a Union regiment during the American Civil War
 7th Regiment New York Volunteer Cavalry, a Union regiment during the American Civil War
 7th Ohio Cavalry, a Union regiment during the American Civil War
 7th Pennsylvania Cavalry, a Union regiment during the American Civil War
 7th Regiment Tennessee Volunteer Cavalry, a Union regiment during the American Civil War
 7th West Virginia Volunteer Cavalry Regiment, a Union regiment during the American Civil War
 7th Arkansas Cavalry Regiment, a Confederate regiment during the American Civil War
 7th Virginia Cavalry, a Confederate regiment during the American Civil War

Other units 
 7th Squadron, Rhode Island Cavalry, a unit of the Union during the American Civil War

Entertainment and games
 7th Cavalry (film), a 1956 American Western film starring Randolph Scott and Barbar Hale
 7th Cavalry (wargame), a 1976 board wargame that simulates the Battle of Little Big Horn